Richard McCarty (February 19, 1780 – May 18, 1844) was an American politician from New York.

Life
He was the son of Gen. David McCarty (1737–1812; assemblyman in 1792) and Charlotte (Coeymans) McCarty (1746–1828). He was born in that part of Watervliet, New York which was separated in 1791 as the Town of Coeymans. There he attended the common schools.

He was County Clerk of Greene County from 1811 to 1813, and from 1821 to 1822.

McCarty was elected as a Democratic-Republican to the 17th United States Congress, holding office from December 3, 1821, to March 3, 1823. He was President of the Lafayette Bank in New York City and was one of the committee appointed to receive General Lafayette when he visited the United States in 1824 and 1825.

McCarty died in New York City and was buried at the Adams Cemetery in Coxsackie.

State Senator John McCarty (1782–1851) was his brother.

References

1780 births
1844 deaths
People from Coeymans, New York
Democratic-Republican Party members of the United States House of Representatives from New York (state)
People from Greene County, New York
19th-century American politicians